Psidopala apicalis is a moth in the family Drepanidae. It was described by John Henry Leech in 1900. It is found in the Chinese provinces of Gansu, Ningxia, Hubei and Sichuan.

References

Moths described in 1900
Thyatirinae
Moths of Asia